Naranjan Singh Bhalla popularly known as Bhalla Sahib (died 1996) was a 20th-century Sikh leader from Jammu and Kashmir, the northernmost union territory of India.

Life
Born in the early 19th century in the village of Shalkote in the undivided princely state of Jammu and Kashmir, Naranjan Singh Bhalla was one of the most prominent Sikh faces of the Kashmir valley. He played an active role in the Indian freedom movement and many a times evaded arrest.

He played a prominent role to save the members of the Sikh community in the Kashmir valley during the tribal raid of 1947 when the Tribal aided by the Pakistan army attacked Kashmir.

Naranjan Singh Bhalla saved many lives of the members of the Sikh community who were easily identifiable and attacked and brutally killed by the raiders. He led a group of Sikhs to stay in a jungle where they stayed without food for 18 days and he risked his life to bring food for the trapped members of the community. They waited there till the arrival of the Indian Army on 27 October 1947 after which the tribal invasion was repulsed. He played an active role to retrieve the heads of the five Sikhs beheaded by the tribal. Bhalla was a close relative of a revolutionary Sikh leader Akali Kaur Singh and was also a close associate of Sant Singh Tegh. Bhalla remained an active member of the Shiromani Akali Dal in Kashmir.

Roles
Naranjan Singh Bhalla played another vital role in rescuing the female members of the Sikh and Kashmiri pandit community who were kidnapped by the tribal. He led a small group of Sikhs and attacked the exhausted tribal groups and rescued the ladies of the two communities.

After the partition he served for 50 years at the Gurudwara chattipatshahi in Baramulla district of North Kashmir in various capacities and before his death on 22 August 1996 he was the manager of the Gurudwara. He was placed in charge of the affairs of the Gurudwara Sant Rocha Singh Technical Ashram Baramulla by the then sitting Mahant of Dera Nangali Sahib Poonch Mahant Bachiter Singh. When the olden structure of the complex was dismantled by the government and the compensation was given to Mahant Sahib, some dissidents filed a case against Mahant Sahib in the court of Law. Mahant Bachiter Singh, who trusted Naranjan Singh Bhalla, gave power of attorney to him and asked him to fight the case on his behalf. Fearing that the dissidents might encroach upon the land given to Mahant Sahib at Dewan Bagh Baramulla, Bhalla along with his wife and children constructed a small hut on the piece of land and saved it from encroachment. The case was fought for seven years, after which Bhalla won the case and handed over the property to Mahant Sahib. A fabulous Gurudwara was constructed on the new place after winning the case; it was constructed under the guidance and supervision of Bhalla, whom people used to call Bhalla Sahib as a mark of respect. Finally after completion the Gurudwara was handed over to the Sikh Sangat and to this day the Gurudwara stands at the place.
Before and during the construction of the Gurudwara, Mahant Bachiter Singh used to stay at the house of Bhalla Sahib whenever he visited Baramulla.

It is said that once Bhalla sahib and Mahant Sahib were standing in near the Nishan Sahib at the Gurudwara when Bhalla Sahib questioned Mahant Sahib as what would happen to the righteous people in the ongoing Kali Yuga. Mahant Sahib asked Bhalla Sahib to see in the sky, and when he looked in the sky he saw people wearing white robes with white flying beard. Bhalla sahib was drenched in sweat when Mahant Sahib asked him to come back; after that Mahant Sahib told him that those were the Khalsa who had died in different wars with Mughals and the time will come when these people would protect the good souls in the times of trouble.

Naranjan Singh Bhalla was married to Gurbaksh Kour who too was a dedicated Sikh. She died on 30 November 2007 in Lahore, Pakistan when she was on a pilgrimage to the Sikh shrines in Pakistan. To visit the place of the birth of the first Guru of the Sikh Guru Nanak Dev ji was her last dream, and she fulfilled her last dream and gave her life at the very place which she longed for.

Naranjan Singh Bhalla and Gurbakh Kour are survived by three sons and two daughters Surjeet Kaur and Diljeet Kaur.

His grandson, Tejinder Singh Sodhi is a well known Indian journalist, who has been a recipient of the Ford Foundation International Fellowship, McCormick fellowship (twice) a speaker at the National Press Club, Washington DC, Sodhi did his higher studies from the University of Kansas, Lawrence USA

History

The word Bhalla means good and humble, this was not the actual surname of Naranjan Singh. His family name was Kala, but the family attained the name Bhalla because of their good deeds. It is said that in the early eighteenth century, whenever people used to Visit Sialkot on pilgrimage to Gurudwara Tapiana Sahib they had to trek several kilometres by foot and were exhausted, the ancestors of Naranjan Singh used to feed them with Lassi (curd shake) and Makki di roti (corn bread). The surname Bhalla was added to the clan in recognition of their goodness and humility.

References 
http://www.tribuneindia.com/2007/20071201/punjab1.htm

Indian Sikhs
Jammu and Kashmir politicians
1996 deaths
Indian independence activists from Jammu and Kashmir
People from Baramulla district
Year of birth missing